There are 425 hospitals in Chile.  54% of hospitals are private and the remaining 46% are public.

This is a list of hospitals in Chile.  Where there is not an article in the English Wikipedia, but it in the Spanish Wikipedia, the Spanish Wikipedia article link has been included as a parenthetical clickable link, (es).

Santiago Metropolitan Region
Hospital del Tórax, Providencia
Hospital Luis Calvo Mackenna, Santiago
, Independencia
Hospital del Salvador, Providencia
Hospital Sótero del Río, Puente Alto
Hospital Psiquiátrico Dr. Horvitz Barak
San Juan de Dios Hospital
Hospital Luis Tisné, Santiago
Hospital Militar, La Reina
Hospital Dipreca
Hospital Félix Bulnes, Quinta Normal 
Hospital Paula Jaraquemada
Hospital Metropolitano de Santiago, Providencia
Hospital Barros Luco, San Miguel
Hospital Trudeau
Hospital Exequiel González Cortez, San Miguel
Hospital de Enfermedades Infecciosas

Valparaíso Region
  Hospital Naval Almirante Nef, Viña del Mar
 Carlos Van Buren Hospital, Valparaíso
 Gustavo Fricke Hospital, Viña del Mar

Other regions 
Hospital Regional Guillermo Grant Benavente, Concepción
Naval Hospital of Puerto Williams, Puerto Williams
Juan Noe Clinical Hospital Arica
Pichilemu Hospital
Ernesto Torres Galdámes Hospital Iquique
Hospital Clínico Regional de Antofagasta Dr. Leonardo Guzmán Antofagasta
Hospital Clínico Regional Valdivia; Valdivia

References

 Departamento de Estadistica e Informacion de salud, Department of Health Statistics and Information.  Retrieved 11/01/14.
 Global Health Intelligence, Information on Healthcare in emerging markets.  Retrieved 12/15/14.

Hospitals
Chile

Chile